Shelton Farrar Leake (November 30, 1812 – March 4, 1884) was a nineteenth-century politician, lawyer and teacher from Virginia. He served as Virginia’s first lieutenant governor from 1852 to 1856. He also served two non-consecutive terms in the United States House of Representatives.

Biography
Born near Hillsboro, Albemarle County, Virginia Leake completed preparatory studies, taught school, studied law and was admitted to the bar in 1835, commencing practice in Charlottesville, Virginia. He was a member of the Virginia House of Delegates in 1842 and 1843 and was elected a Democrat to the United States House of Representatives in 1844, serving from 1845 to 1847. Afterward, Leake resumed practicing law and in 1851 was elected the first Lieutenant Governor of Virginia, serving from 1852 to 1856. He was elected back to the House of Representatives as an Independent Democrat in 1858, serving again from 1859 to 1861. Leake again resumed practicing law until his death in Charlottesville, Virginia on March 4, 1884. He was interred in Charlottesville in Maplewood Cemetery.

Electoral history

1845; Leake was elected to the U.S. House of Representatives with 52.55% of the vote, defeating an Independent identified only as Irving.
1859; Leake was re-elected with 59.17% of the vote, defeating Democrat Paulus Powell.

External links

1812 births
1884 deaths
People from Albemarle County, Virginia
Members of the Virginia House of Delegates
Virginia lawyers
Democratic Party members of the United States House of Representatives from Virginia
Lieutenant Governors of Virginia
Virginia Independents
Independent Democrat members of the United States House of Representatives
19th-century American politicians
19th-century American lawyers